Hickman Blacksmith Shop and House, also known as the Chas. C. Connell Roofing, Gutter, and Siding Co. and Jeffrey and Pamella Seemans House, is a historic home and blacksmith shop located at Marshallton, New Castle County, Delaware. The shop was built about 1899, and is a rectangular, frame, -story building on a high stone foundation.  The house was built about 1860, and is a side-passage plan, frame, 2-story dwelling on a stone foundation, with Stick trim and modest interior finish.

It was added to the National Register of Historic Places in 1994.

References

Houses on the National Register of Historic Places in Delaware
Commercial buildings on the National Register of Historic Places in Delaware
Commercial buildings completed in 1899
Houses completed in 1860
Houses in New Castle County, Delaware
1899 establishments in Delaware
National Register of Historic Places in New Castle County, Delaware
Blacksmith shops